FK Banga Gargždai is a Lithuanian football club from the city of Gargždai.

History 
FK Banga was founded in 1966. During the period from 1966 to 1990, the club was in the Soviet Lithuanian football championship. From 1990, they played in the Lithuanian championship. From 1994 to 2001, they were in the top tier. After the 2001 A Lyga, they were relegated to the I Lyga.

The team earned promotion to the A Lyga, Lithuania's top football division, for the 2009 season after FBK Kaunas and Atlantas Klaipėda voluntarily withdrew their participation. Banga were also members of the A Lyga from 1994 to 2000.

In the 2019 LFF I Lyga, FK Banga finished in second position and played in the relegation/promotion match with FK Palanga. Banga won the playoff, passed the licensing process, and returned to the top division after a 5-year break. In the 2020 A Lyga, FK Banga finished in 4th position. It was the best result in FK Banga history in A Lyga.

Achievements
A Lyga:
4th place (1): 2020
Lithuanian Cup:
Runners-up (3): 2011, 2014, 2019.

Recent seasons

UEFA club competition record
Source: uefa.com
Last updated: 11 July 2014

Matches

Current squad

Kit evolution 
 Kits at home: orange kits, shorts and socks with darkblue signs. 

 Away kits: dark blue kits, shorts and socks with orange signs.

Managers
 Fiodoras Finkelis (19??–77)
 Leonardas Lukavičius (1990–95)
 Fabio Lopez (2008)
 Valdas Ivanauskas (2008–09)
 Vytautas Jančiauskas (2009–10)
 Arminas Narbekovas (16 December 2009 – 1 January 2012)
 Vaidas Žutautas (6 January 2012–2013)
 Vaidas Žutautas (2013–2014)
 Maksim Tishchenko (2014–2015)
 Vaidas Žutautas (2015–2016)
 Tomas Tamošauskas (2017 – 3 June 2021)
  David Afonso, (from 3 June 2021)

References

External links
Official website 
alyga.lt 
 FK Banga in Soccerway

 
Banga
Sport in Gargždai
1966 establishments in Lithuania
Banga